René Italo Ricolfi-Doria (30 April 1901 – 4 February 1970) was a Swiss freestyle swimmer. He competed in the two events and the water polo at the 1920 Summer Olympics.

References

External links
 

1901 births
1970 deaths
Swiss male freestyle swimmers
Swiss male water polo players
Olympic swimmers of Switzerland
Olympic water polo players of Switzerland
Swimmers at the 1920 Summer Olympics
Water polo players at the 1920 Summer Olympics
Sportspeople from Geneva